Simta is a rural municipality located in Surkhet District of Karnali Province of Nepal.

Demographics
At the time of the 2011 Nepal census, 99.9% of the population in Simta Rural Municipality spoke Nepali as their first language; 0.1% spoke other languages.

In terms of ethnicity/caste, 40.5% were Chhetri, 20.6% Kami, 16.1% Thakuri, 8.7% Magar, 5.5% Damai/Dholi, 3.3% Sanyasi/Dasnami, 1.9% Hill Brahmin, 1.6% Badi, 1.2% Sarki and 0.6% others.

In terms of religion, 99.2% were Hindu and 0.8% Christian.

References

External links
 Official website

Populated places in Surkhet District
Rural municipalities in Karnali Province
Rural municipalities of Nepal established in 2017